Sturgis Fork is a stream in the U.S. state of Oregon. It is a tributary to Carberry Creek.

Sturgis Fork was named in 1900 after one Alonzo J. Sturgis.

References

Rivers of Oregon
Rivers of Jackson County, Oregon
Rivers of Josephine County, Oregon